Dayr Hafir District is a district of Aleppo Governorate in northern Syria. Administrative centre is the city of Dayr Ḥāfir.

The district was formed in 2009 from three subdistricts formerly belonging to al-Bab District. At the 2004 census, these subdistricts had a total population of 91,124.

Subdistricts
The district of Dayr Hafir is divided into three subdistricts or nawāḥī (population as of 2004):

References

 
Districts of Aleppo Governorate
2009 establishments in Syria